Gabriel Ramírez may refer to:

 Gabriel Ramírez (footballer, born 1982), Uruguayan forward
 Gabriel Ramírez (footballer, born 1995), Argentine midfielder